Marcel Simoneau (born June 22, 1978 in Quebec, Canada) is a New York City based actor who has appeared on TV in: The Blacklist, God Friended Me, Gotham, Unbreakable Kimmy Schmidt, Fringe, Law & Order, Ed and Strangers with Candy. He has also appeared in the films: The Rebound, Imperialists are Still Alive, Zenith, Nick & Norah's Infinite Playlist, Stranger and Kinsey.

Marcel also has done extensive Voice-Over work in commercials for Budweiser, Canada Dry, NyQuill, GoDaddy, Goody, Chloe, BDO, MFS among others and in TV & Film: Little Women, Emily in Paris, The Queen's Gambit, The Marvelous Mrs. Maisel, Wildlife, High Maintenance, Super Troopers 2, What Just Happened, Royal Pains and The Pirates of Somalia.

His band, Hot Seconds, can also be heard in the TV shows: Shameless, The Unit, The Big Bang Theory, The New Girl, Gossip Girl and The Office''.

He studied at The Lee Strasberg Theatre Institute, NYU, Columbia University and the Maggie Flanigan Studio.

He currently teaches Method Acting at the Lee Strasberg Theater Institute and at New York University (NYU).

Filmography

Film

Television

Director

Producer

Music Videos

Music 
Marcel was a member of the band Hot Seconds. He also records under the pen name Potterfield.

Personal life 
Marcel is the oldest of nine children.

References

External links
 Actor's website
 Film Company Website

Living people
1978 births
Canadian male film actors
Canadian male television actors
Male actors from Quebec
People from Rimouski
French Quebecers